Lew or LEW may refer to:

People
 Lew (given name) 
 Lew (surname)

Places
 Lew, Oxfordshire, England
 River Lew, in Devon, England

Transport
 LEW Hennigsdorf, a rail vehicle factory in Hennigsdorf, Germany
 Lew (locomotive), a British narrow gauge railway locomotive built in 1897 for the Lynton and Barnstaple Railway
 Auburn/Lewiston Municipal Airport, by IATA airport code
 Lewisham station, by National Rail station code

Other uses
 An ancient manor now within the parish of Northlew, Devon
 Irene Lew, the main female character in the Ninja Gaiden trilogy

See also
 
 
 Lou (disambiguation)
 Loo (disambiguation)
 Lieu (disambiguation)